Daniel Holdsworth is an Australian musician and composer. He is a co-creator of the music-theatre production, Tubular Bells for Two, and has performed in bands such as Darks Common Underground, The Maple Trail and The Saturns. He has also composed music for film, television, theatre and dance.

Biography
Daniel Holdsworth was born on 22 May 1981, in Penrith NSW, Australia, and has lived most of his life in the Blue Mountains. He began playing music at a young age and attended Blaxland High School where he was heavily involved in school productions and other music programs, performing several times at the Sydney Opera House. During this period he also began formal training as a classical guitarist.

At the age of fifteen, Daniel began professional work within the music industry as a session musician, notably recording with Yothu Yindi for the closing ceremony of the 1996 Atlanta paralympics, and singing a duet for the same ceremony composed by Garry Hardman from Australian Screen Music.

After high school, Holdsworth attended the University of Western Sydney where he studied with Bruce Crossman as a post-graduate in composition and music technology. During his university years he worked as a music teacher in the Blue Mountains, whilst also playing in many bands. His main focus was as singer/songwriter/guitarist of the award-winning rock band, The Saturns, who released several recordings and toured Australia extensively between 2005 and 2008. He recorded and toured with other bands, including The Maple Trail. During this period Daniel began composing music for theatre and dance productions, leading to a position as musical director and performer in William Yang's My Generation, which was commissioned for the opening of the National Portrait Gallery (Australia) in Canberra in 2008.

In 2009, Holdsworth premiered a music-theatre collaboration with Aidan Roberts, Tubular Bells for Two. The production involves the two musicians recreating Mike Oldfield's 1973 album, Tubular Bells, with over twenty instruments. Roberts and Holdsworth received a Sydney Fringe Award for 'Best Musical Moment' in the Sydney Fringe Festival 2010. The duo have since gone on to tour the show internationally, winning a Herald Angel Award and a Sixth Star Bobby Award at the Edinburgh Fringe 2012, a Weekly Award and BankSA Best Music Award at the Adelaide Fringe 2015.

In 2013 Daniel composed the music for the feature film, William Yang: My Generation which premiered at the Sydney Film Festival.

In 2015 Holdsworth formed a new group, Darks Common Underground, working on his first original material as a songwriter since the Saturns broke up in 2010. The band released their debut self-titled album in 2020.

Awards

Recordings

DVD

Theatre

Film

Television

References

External links
 Official website of Daniel Holdsworth
 Official website of Tubular Bells for Two

1981 births
Living people
Australian musicians
Australian male composers
Australian composers